Mahurak (also Romanized as Māhūrak; also known as Māhūzak and Mūrak) is a village in Karchambu-e Jonubi Rural District, in the Central District of Buin va Miandasht County, Isfahan Province, Iran. At the 2006 census, its population was 133, in 30 families.

References 

Populated places in Buin va Miandasht County